The Naden gecko (Gekko nadenensis) is a species of gecko. It is endemic to central Laos.

References

Gekko
Reptiles described in 2017
Endemic fauna of Laos
Reptiles of Laos